Mount Sinai Temple was a Reform synagogue located in Sioux City, Iowa, United States.  The building was listed on the National Register of Historic Places in 1999.

History
There were Jews living in Sioux City as early as the 1860s, but a synagogue was not built in the city until 1884.  Adas Jeshurun was an Orthodox congregation.  The Jewish community in Sioux City grew from 200 in 1890 to nearly 2,500 by World War I.  Sioux City was home to the second largest Jewish community in the state of Iowa at the time.  Mount Sinai Temple was established in 1901.  The synagogue, which opened the same year, was expanded in 1922.  The building was designed in the Prairie School style.  Between World Wars I and II the Jewish Community Center in Sioux City hosted  60 to 70 clubs, classes and organizations that ranged from socialist workers to Zionists.  A one-mile section of West Seventh Street was home to 22 Jewish owned businesses in 1944.

After World War II the Jewish community in Sioux City began to decline.  By the mid 1980s the population was down to 700 people, and by 2001 it was down to 300.  The Jewish congregations in Sioux City combined their religious schools in 1990. Four years later the congregations themselves merged at Beth Shalom, the Conservative synagogue.

The Mount Sinai Temple was built as a one-and-one-half story, frame, clapboard- and shingle-sided, Queen Anne-style building;  its 1922 addition designed by William L. Steele was in Prairie School style.

References

Jewish organizations established in 1901
Synagogues completed in 1901
Synagogues completed in 1922
Prairie School synagogues
Prairie School architecture in Iowa
Synagogues in Iowa
Reform synagogues in Iowa
Buildings and structures in Sioux City, Iowa
National Register of Historic Places in Sioux City, Iowa
Synagogues on the National Register of Historic Places in Iowa
1901 establishments in Iowa